Henry Fisher (by 1519 – 1566 or later) was an English politician.

He was a Member (MP) of the Parliament of England for Saltash in 1547, Reigate in March 1553, and Knaresborough in 1555.

References

Year of death missing
Members of the pre-1707 English Parliament for constituencies in Cornwall
Year of birth uncertain
English MPs 1547–1552
English MPs 1553 (Edward VI)
English MPs 1555